Glacier County is located in the U.S. state of Montana. As of the 2020 census, the population was 13,778. The county is located in northwestern Montana between the Great Plains and the Rocky Mountains, known to the Blackfeet as the "Backbone of the World". The county is geographically and culturally diverse and includes the Blackfeet Indian Reservation, Glacier National Park, and Lewis and Clark National Forest. The county is bordered by 75 miles of international boundary with two ports of entry (Piegan and Del Bonita) open year-round and one seasonal (Chief Mountain) international border crossing into Alberta, Canada.

Settlements
Several small unincorporated communities, one incorporated town, and one incorporated city are located within the county.

Cut Bank, the county seat with a population of around 3000, is located in eastern Glacier County, on the edge of the Great Plains. Cut Bank arose from the railroad and agriculture needs of the surrounding area, and was fostered by an oil boom in the 1920s. The town's diverse population is the result of this settlement. Town resources include a hospital and clinic, a historic airport with regional and international connections, a nine-hole golf course, and a swimming pool. Nearby sites of the Lewis and Clark expedition and other historic and prehistoric sites can be visited. The Glacier County Museum has a collection of area artifacts, historic buildings, community memorabilia, and a comprehensive archive of early area history and individuals, including a large collection of data on Blackfeet history.

Browning is the home and government seat of the Blackfeet Tribe. The incorporated portion of Browning, at 1,400, does not reflect the population of 7,000 in the community that is largely representative of the Blackfeet Tribe on a part of their ancestral homeland dating back over 400 years. Town resources include a federal building, community college, Native American Museum and Heritage Center, casino, fairgrounds, race track, and Native American camp area that hosts an annual Native American celebration and pow-wow. Many events center on this area during the summer months. Blackfeet tribal fishing and recreational permits, along with guide and tour services to blue ribbon trout fishing and other recreational opportunities, can be found there.

Babb is a small unincorporated farming and ranching community on the Blackfeet Indian Reservation. The community experiences a large influx of tourists in the summer months as it is the gateway to the Many Glacier area of Glacier National Park. Community infrastructure includes one school, a US post office, a fire station, a general store and motel, several restaurants, two churches, and a gas station. Nearby attractions include Glacier National Park, the Many Glacier Hotel, the St. Mary River, the St. Mary Irrigation Canal, Chief Mountain, and the US ports of entry of Piegan and Chief Mountain.

East Glacier Park Village, a small winter community, grows in the summer with many visitors and the summer help from all parts of the globe that meet the needs of the larger population. It is the site of the largest of Glacier Park's historic hotels and fleet of “red buses”. It has a nine-hole golf course, campgrounds, trail rides, boat rides, and native interpretive tours.

St. Mary is an unincorporated community on the western border of the Blackfeet Native American Reservation adjacent to Glacier National Park. The village is the eastern terminus of the Going-to-the-Sun Road which bisects the park east to west, a distance of 53 miles (85 km). Fewer than 50 people reside in the village year-round; however, the population increases tenfold on a busy summer evening. It has several lodges, restaurants and cafés, a small grocery store, two gas stations and campgrounds. A large housing area for National Park Service personnel is located adjacent to the village, but within the park. U.S. Route 89 passes through the village, which lies between Saint Mary Lake in Glacier National Park and Lower St. Mary Lake on the Blackfeet Native American Reservation.

Starr School is a census-designated place (CDP) in Glacier County. The population was 252 at the 2010 census.

Geography
About 71% of the county's land area lies within the Blackfeet Indian Reservation. Another 21% lies within Glacier National Park in western Glacier County.

Adjacent counties

 Flathead County - west
 Pondera County - south
 Toole County - east
 Cardston County, Alberta - north
 Improvement District No. 4, Alberta (Waterton Lakes National Park) - northwest
 County of Warner No. 5, Alberta - northeast

National protected areas
 Glacier National Park (part)
 Lewis and Clark National Forest (part)

Politics
Owing largely to its majority Native American population, Glacier County generally votes Democratic, in contrast with most other rural Montana counties, which trend Republican.

Demographics

2000 census
At the 2000 United States census, there were 13,247 people, 4,304 households and 3,245 families in the county. The population density was 4 per square mile (2/km2). There were 5,243 housing units at an average density of 2 per square mile (1/km2). The racial makeup of the county was 35.43% White, 0.08% Black or African American, 61.80% Native American, 0.07% Asian, 0.05% Pacific Islander, 0.18% from other races, and 2.39% from two or more races. 1.20% of the population were Hispanic or Latino of any race. 11.3% were of German ancestry. 90.1% spoke English, 6.0% Blackfoot and 3.6% German as their first language.

There were 4,304 households, of which 42.90% had children under the age of 18 living with them, 53.3% were married couples living together, 16.2% had a female householder with no husband present, and 24.6% were non-families. 21.6% of all households were made up of individuals, and 7.7% had someone living alone who was 65 years of age or older. The average household size was 3.03 and the average family size was 3.56.

The county population contained 34.9% under age 18, 9.1% from 18 to 24, 26.9% from 25 to 44, 19.9% from 45 to 64, and 9.2% who were 65 years of age or older. The median age was 31 years. For every 100 females there were 97.9 males. For every 100 females age 18 and over, there were 94.1 males.

The median household income was $27,921 and the median family income was $31,193. Males had a median income of $27,445 compared $23,036 for females. The per capita income for the county was $11,597. About 23.5% of families and 27.3% of the population were below the poverty line, including 32.7% of those under age 18 and 20.1% of those age 65 or over.

2010 census
As of the 2010 United States census, there were 13,399 people, 4,361 households, and 3,088 families residing in the county. The racial makeup of the county was 65.6% Native American, 31.1% white, 0.2% Asian, 0.1% black or African American, 0.2% from other races, and 2.8% from two or more races. Those of Hispanic or Latino origin made up 1.8% of the population. In terms of ancestry, 13.6% were German, 7.2% were Irish, 5.6% were Norwegian, and 1.4% were American.

Of the 4,361 households, 44.0% had children under the age of 18 living with them, 42.8% were married couples living together, 19.1% had a female householder with no husband present, 29.2% were non-families, and 24.9% of all households were made up of individuals. The average household size was 2.91 and the average family size was 3.49. The median age was 31.7 years.

The median income for a household in the county was $38,075 and the median income for a family was $44,397. Males had a median income of $31,700 versus $30,594 for females. The per capita income for the county was $17,053. About 21.4% of families and 25.4% of the population were below the poverty line, including 35.0% of those under age 18 and 12.9% of those age 65 or over.

Communities

City
 Cut Bank (county seat)

Town
 Browning

Census-designated places

 Babb
 Big Sky Colony
 Blackfoot
 East Glacier Park Village
 Glacier Colony
 Glendale Colony
 Hidden Lake Colony
 Horizon Colony
 Little Browning
 North Browning
 Santa Rita
 Seville Colony
 South Browning
 St. Mary
 Starr School
 Zenith Colony

Unincorporated communities

 Bison
 False Summit
 Fort Piegan
 Gunsight
 Kiowa
 Meriwether
 Piegan
 Rising Sun
 Star
 Summit
 Sundance
 Swift Current

See also
 List of lakes in Glacier County, Montana
 List of mountains in Glacier County, Montana
 National Register of Historic Places listings in Glacier County, Montana

References

 
1919 establishments in Montana
Populated places established in 1919